The White Broken Line: Live Recordings is a live album by Juliana Hatfield, released in 2006.

Track listing
All songs written by Juliana Hatfield

 "Hotels" – 5:02
 "Get In Line" – 3:19
 "Oh" – 3:14
 "Necessito" – 3:11
 "Somebody Is Waiting For Me" – 3:13
 "Rats in the Attic" – 3:24
 "Choose Drugs" – 3:15
 "Ten-Foot Pole" – 2:39
 "My Sister" – 3:38
 "Down On Me" – 2:56
 "My Protégée" – 4:10
 "Slow Motion / Because We Love You" – 6:29

Tracks 1,4,5,6 recorded at Paradise Rock Club, Boston, 2005.

Tracks 2,10,11 recorded at Pearl Street, Northampton, 2005.

Track 3 recorded at Avalon, Boston, 2005.

Tracks 7,8 recorded at Orpheum Theater, Boston, 2002.

Tracks 9,12 recorded at Maxwell's, Hoboken, 2005.

Personnel
Musicians

Juliana Hatfield - vocals, guitar
Ed Velauskas - bass, backing vocals
Pete Caldes - drums

Production

Tom Dube - recording, mixing

Juliana Hatfield albums
2006 live albums